An election to South Dublin County Council took place on 10 June 1999 as part of that year's Irish local elections. 26 councillors were elected from five local electoral areas  for a five-year term of office on the system of proportional representation by means of the single transferable vote (PR-STV).

Results by party

Results by Electoral Area

Clondalkin

Lucan

Tallaght Central

Tallaght Oldbawn

Terenure-Rathfarnam

External links
 Official website

1999 Irish local elections
1999